Brian Cadle (September 13, 1948 – November 6, 2015) was a professional ice hockey player who played 56 games as a left winger in the World Hockey Association with the Winnipeg Jets, during their inaugural 1972–73 season. He died of brain cancer in 2015.

References

External links
 

1948 births
2015 deaths
Canadian ice hockey left wingers
Greensboro Generals (SHL) players
Ice hockey people from British Columbia
People from North Vancouver
Winnipeg Jets (WHA) players